The Shanghai Rainbow Chamber Singers is a chamber choir group based in Shanghai, China. The group was founded in 2010 by conductor Jin Chengzhi and his classmates from the Shanghai Conservatory of Music. The choir performs a concert every six months, staging traditional-style choral works both existing and newly written. As of 2016, the group had 44 members, including both students and working personnel.
In 2020, the group participated and won the reality show We Are Blazing.

Discography 

 (2016) Where Did You Put My House Keys, Zhang Shichao?
 (2016) So Far, the Sofa is So Far
 (2017) What I Do Is For Your Own Good
 (2021) Star River Hotel

References

External links 
 SRCS Facebook page
 SRCS Bilibili page

Chinese choirs
Musical groups from Shanghai
Musical groups established in 2010